Events in the year 1548 in Norway.

Incumbents
Monarch: Christian III

Events
 Summer – Prince Frederick II of Norway  was  proclaimed as heir apparent to Christian III of Norway, in Oslo.
The Plague of 1547–1548 ends. It was a bubonic plague, that spread to large parts of South Norway.

Arts and literature

Births

Deaths
12 June – Jens Olavssøn Bratt, clergyman (born c. 1505).

Exact date unknown 
Torbjørn Bratt, clergyman and bishop (born c. 1502).

See also

References